The Unlawful Games Act 1541 (33 Hen 8 c 9), sometimes referred to as the Suppression of Unlawful Games Act 1541, was an Act of the Parliament of England, designed to prohibit "Several new devised Games" that caused "the Decay of Archery".  All Men under the Age of sixty Years "shall have Bows and Arrows for shooting". Men-Children between Seven "Years and Seventeen shall have a Bow and 2 Shafts". Men about Seventeen "Years of Age shall keep a Bow and 4 Arrows".  The penalty for nonobservance was set at 6s.8d.

Archery, which had been the key to Henry V's victory at the 1415 Battle of Agincourt, had been required of the labourers, servants, artificers, or victuallers as early as 1388 (12 Ric 2, c.6) and 1409 (11 Hen IV, c.4), and again in An Act concerning shooting in Long Bows (3 Hen 8, c.3) and the Act for Maintenance of Archery (6 Hen 8, c.2), among others.  In fact, the law of 1409 had as punishment six days' imprisonment; and reference is made herein to an act in the Parliament at Canterbury of Richard the Lionheart.

John Warleman of St Mary Magdalen Oxford was prosecuted for fixing a game of Le Tenyse while the Tudor kings played on:
Item duodecim jurati presentant quod quidam Iohannes Warleman de parochia sancte Magdalene recepit diatim infra domum suam diversos homines ludentes ad pilam vocat le Tenyse & alia joca illicita.

Section 1 of the Gaming Act 1845 repealed much of the Unlawful Games Act 1541.

The Statute Law Revision Act 1948 repealed Sections 11 to 13, part of Section 8, and the preambulatory words "by reason therof Archerie ys sore decayed, and dayly is lyke to be more mynished..." Archery could not compete with the nefarious pursuits of cricket, dicing, and carding.

The remainder of the whole Act was repealed by section 15 of, and Part I of Schedule 6 to, the Betting and Gaming Act 1960 (8 & 9 Eliz. 2, c.60).

The Act forbade all sport on Christmas Day with the exception of archery practice, meaning that footballers who played on Christmas Day before 1960, when the Football League routinely scheduled fixtures for 25 December, had technically broken the law.

Section 5
This is section 7 in Ruffhead's Edition. It was of a local character.

See also
 History of gambling in the United Kingdom
 List of Acts of the Parliament of England, 1485–1601

References
 Halsbury's Statutes
 The Statutes: Revised Edition. Volume I. Eyre and Spottiswoode, Printers to the Queen. London. 1870. Pages lxxiv and 494 to 498.

Acts of the Parliament of England (1485–1603)
1541 in law
1541 in England
History of archery
Archery in the United Kingdom